is a passenger railway station in located in the city of Hikone,  Shiga Prefecture, Japan, operated by the private railway operator Ohmi Railway.

Lines
Hikone-Serikawa Station is served by the Ohmi Railway Main Line, and is located 7.0 rail kilometers from the terminus of the line at Maibara Station.

Station layout
The station consists of one side platform serving a single track. There is no station building, only a shelter on the platform. The station is unattended.

Adjacent stations

History
The station opened on 8 March 2009 is the newest station of Ohmi Railway.

Passenger statistics
In fiscal 2019, the station was used by an average of 116 passengers daily (boarding passengers only).

Surrounding area
Hikone Municipal Sawayama Elementary School
Hikone Municipal Higashi Junior High School
Hikone Comprehensive High School 
Serigawa River

See also
List of railway stations in Japan

References

External links

 Ohmi Railway official site

Railway stations in Shiga Prefecture
Railway stations in Japan opened in 2009
Hikone, Shiga